USS Ortolan is a name used more than once by the United States Navy in naming of its ships:

  a minesweeper laid down on 9 July 1918 by the Staten Island Shipbuilding Co., New York, New York.
  laid down on 28 August 1968 as a twin-hulled submarine rescue ship.

References 

United States Navy ship names